Fadel Ahmed Abdullah al-Hiyali (died 18 August 2015), better known by his noms de guerre Abu Muslim al-Turkmani, Haji Mutazz, or Abu Mutaz al-Qurashi, was the Islamic State of Iraq and the Levant (ISIL) governor for territories held by the organization in Iraq. He was considered the ISIL second-in-command (along with his counterpart Abu Ali al-Anbari, who held a similar position in Syria); he played a political role of overseeing the local councils and a military role that includes directing operations against opponents of ISIL. His names were also spelt Fadhil Ahmad al-Hayali, and Hajji Mutazz.

Biography
An ethnic Turkmen born in Tal Afar, Nineveh Governorate, al-Hiyali was an Iraqi Army Colonel under Saddam Hussein. According to documents discovered in Iraq, al-Hiyali was a lieutenant colonel in the Iraqi military's intelligence unit Istikhbarat (Directorate of General Military Intelligence), who also spent time as a Special Forces officer in the Special Republican Guard right up until the US-led 2003 invasion of Iraq. He also fought in the Gulf War prior to his dismissal from the Iraqi Army after US forces arrived, and later joined Sunni insurgents to fight the Americans. He was later made the deputy leader of ISIL in Iraq on 8 April 2013. Like other ISIL leaders, al-Turkmani spent time in a US prison in Iraq, specifically Camp Bucca. He once practiced a moderate form of Islam.

However, according to an obituary for deputy leader Abu Ali al-Anbari published by ISIS after his death, al-Hiyali had actually been radicalized and recruited by al-Anbari who had been preaching Islamic extremism in and around Tel Afar in the mid to late 1990s. The biography states that al-Hiyali had renounced his belief in Ba'athism and loyalty to Saddam Hussein, leaving the Iraqi army and joining Abu Ali al-Anbari's organization, Ansar al-Islam, providing important logistical aid and training to jihadist networks. This would mean that al-Hiyali was a jihadist long before the US-led invasion of Iraq. This close association between Abu Ali al-Anbari and al-Hiyali would endure during their jihadist career, with Abu Muslim joining Jama'at al-Tawhid wal-Jihad (which subsequently became Al-Qaeda in Iraq) around 2003 when Al-Qaduli (Abu Ali al-Anbari) did so after spending time with Zarqawi. 

He oversaw ISIL-designated governors in various cities and regions of Iraq, including identified shadow governors in areas that ISIL did not control, but had aspirations over. "I describe Baghdadi as a shepherd, and his deputies are the dogs who herd the sheep (ISIL members); the strength of the shepherd comes from his dogs." said Hisham al-Hashimi, a security analyst who had access to documents discovered which provided details on al-Hiyali.

In a June 2015 article in The New York Times, al-Turkmani was said to have been the head of ISIL’s military council. He reportedly led the council of six to nine military commanders who directed the terrorist group's military strategy, according to Laith Alkhouri, a senior analyst at Flashpoint Global Partners.

Al-Hiyali was at the forefront of the genocide against the Yezidi people including the enslavement of the women and girls, personally raping captives and executing prisoners despite pleas for mercy. 

There were erroneous reports of his death in airstrikes on 7 November 2014 and again in December 2014. This was believed to have been due to a case of mistaken identity and his death was not confirmed by ISIL.

Al-Turkmani was killed by a US drone strike while travelling in a car near Mosul, Iraq on 18 August 2015. His death was confirmed by ISIL official spokesman and senior leader Abu Mohammad al-Adnani in an audio recording posted on jihadist websites in October 2015. He was succeeded as the ISIL leader in Iraq by Abu Fatima al-Jaheishi.

References

2015 deaths
Iraqi Turkmen people
Islamic State of Iraq and the Levant members from Iraq
Iraqi Ground Forces officers
Genocide perpetrators
Iraqi rapists
Members of al-Qaeda in Iraq
Prisoners and detainees of the United States military
Iraqi prisoners and detainees
Deaths by United States drone strikes in Iraq
Deaths by airstrike during the War in Iraq (2013–2017)
Year of birth missing
Violence against women in Iraq